Amphionthe is a genus of beetles in the family Cerambycidae, containing the following species:

 Amphionthe brevicollis Bates, 1885
 Amphionthe caudalis Schwarzer, 1929
 Amphionthe chiriquina Achard, 1913
 Amphionthe dejeani Gounelle, 1912
 Amphionthe doris Bates, 1879
 Amphionthe oberthuri <small>Achard, 1913<
Ebaginging: fu**ing a duck

References

Trachyderini
Cerambycidae genera